Gibran Latif Hamdan (born February 8, 1981) is a former professional American football quarterback in the National Football League and NFL Europa. He was drafted by the Washington Redskins in the seventh round of the 2003 NFL Draft. He played college football at Indiana. Hamdan was also a member of the Amsterdam Admirals, Seattle Seahawks, San Francisco 49ers, Miami Dolphins, and Buffalo Bills. He is the first person of Pakistani descent to play in the NFL.

Early years
Hamdan's mother was a 16-year-old from Pakistan when she married his father, a nuclear engineer of Palestinian descent who attended the University of Illinois met her on a business trip. Hamdan was born in San Diego, but his family moved to Kuwait when he was three.

The family—which includes his younger brother, Bush—was on vacation back in San Diego when Iraq invaded Kuwait in 1991, destroying the family home and possessions. The Hamdans stayed in the U.S., and his mother took a job cutting hair until the family eventually settled in Potomac, Maryland.

Hamdan saw his first action at Winston Churchill High School in Potomac, MD as a backup quarterback. After his sophomore year, Hamdan transferred to Bishop Denis J. O'Connell High School in Arlington, Virginia. As the football team's starting quarterback, he led the Northern Virginia area in passing yards, becoming Virginia Independent Schools Player of the Year and earning first-team all-league and district honors. Hamdan also was a starting center for the school's basketball team and played baseball for the 15-and-under U.S. National Baseball team.

College career
Hamdan attended Indiana University where he posted 2,115 yards and nine touchdowns during his senior year for the Indiana Hoosiers. His yardage total was seventh-best in Indiana history. He was named Big Ten Co-Player of the Week for his 24-of-36, 310-yard and career-high four touchdown performance in 32–29 win over Wisconsin. Hamdan also played baseball at Indiana.

Professional career

Washington Redskins
Hamdan was a seventh-round (232nd overall) pick by the Washington Redskins in the 2003 NFL Draft.  Though he was impressive in training camp, the team originally decided to keep just two quarterbacks entering the regular season.  He was on the team's practice squad the first ten weeks of his rookie season before being signed to the active roster.  He suited up for all five of the remaining games, and Hamdan finally made his NFL debut on December 27 during the last two minutes of the game against the Philadelphia Eagles, achieving one first down while going 1-for-2 for seven yards.

Hamdan played in NFL Europe in the spring of 2004, where he was backup quarterback behind third-year NFL Europe veteran Clint Stoerner.  He was released by the Redskins in September following training camp.

Seattle Seahawks (first stint)
Hamdan was out of the league until 2005 when he was signed by the Seattle Seahawks and once again allocated to NFL Europa.  Though originally winning the starting quarterback job for the Amsterdam Admirals over Kurt Kittner, a broken collarbone cut short Hamdan's season.  In the four games he started he posted 39 completions out of 75 attempts for a total of 556 yards, five touchdowns and two interceptions.  He was once again released at the conclusion of training camp.

In January 2006, Hamdan was re-signed by the Seahawks and allocated to NFL Europe for the third straight year. A broken ankle injury incurred on the first down of the first drive of game seven cut short his season once again, Hamdan was the league's leading passer and earned Offensive Most Valuable Player honors. He started seven games and posted 102 completions out 162 attempts for a total of 1629 yards, 12 touchdowns and three interceptions, posting a perfect passer rating in the third game of the season against Frankfurt Galaxy. He holds the record for average passer rating for the season in NFL Europe at 113.4.  This would not be enough to make the Seahawks however, as he was waived on August 28, 2006.

San Francisco 49ers
The San Francisco 49ers claimed Hamdan off waivers but released him a few days later.  On September 3, he was signed to the 49ers' practice squad.

Seattle Seahawks (second stint)
Due to an injury to starting quarterback Matt Hasselbeck, the Seahawks elected to re-sign Hamdan to their active roster on October 24 to provide depth. He was inactive for six games with the Seahawks before being released on December 5 and added to the team's practice squad.

Miami Dolphins
After Hamdan's contract with the Seahawks expired in January, he was signed to a future contract with the Miami Dolphins on February 6, 2007. He was released at the conclusion of the preseason on September 1.

Buffalo Bills
On September 26, 2007, the Buffalo Bills signed Hamdan to their practice squad after an injury to starting quarterback J. P. Losman. The Bills released Craig Nall and promoted Hamdan to the team's 3rd QB on October 19. Due to injury of Trent Edwards, Hamdan was promoted to backup quarterback for the game between the Bills and the Bengals on November 4, 2007.

Hamdan appeared in 3 preseason games in 2008, completing 30/47 passes for 258 yards averaging 5.5 yards, a 63.8% completion rate with no touchdowns or interceptions for a passer rating of 78.1. Hamdan suffered a concussion during the final preseason game against the Detroit Lions, a game in which he started.

Hamdan was promoted backup quarterback for the last two games of the 2008 season pushing J.P. Losman back to third string, who had lost his starting role earlier that year to Trent Edwards.

A restricted free agent in the 2009 offseason, Hamdan was re-signed by the Bills on February 26 as the Buffalo Bills. The signing of Ryan Fitzpatrick put him back to third string at the start of the 2009 training camp.

He attended the NFL broadcasters bootcamp in 2009 and was featured his own weekly show on the Buffalo Bills website named 'Hanging Ten with Hamdan'.

Hamdan appeared in all 4 2009 preseason games, with 32/48 attempts completed for 427 yards averaging 8.9 yards, a 66.7% completion rate, one touchdown and 2 interceptions for a passer rating of 84.3.

Hamdan was waived on November 19, 2009, in favor of Brian Brohm, who was signed off the Green Bay Packers' practice squad. The Bills re-signed Hamdan on December 22, 2009, after injuries to Fitzpatrick and Edwards, with cornerback Terrence McGee going on injured reserve to make room for Hamdan on the roster.

Toronto Argonauts
On March 10, 2010, it was announced that Hamdan had signed a one-year plus an option contract with the Toronto Argonauts of the Canadian Football League. He retired from football on June 4, 2010.

International baseball career 
Hamdan played youth international baseball for the United States U-15 national baseball team. However, on August 18, 2022, he announced that he would represent Pakistan in the qualifiers for the 2023 World Baseball Classic.

Personal life
Hamdan is married to Jenny Grant, granddaughter of former head coach in the NFL and CFL Bud Grant. Hamdan's younger brother Bush is also a former quarterback who played at Boise State, and is currently an assistant coach at Missouri.

After football, Hamdan started his own fashion line.

References

External links
 Toronto Argonauts bio
 Buffalo Bills bio

1981 births
Living people
People from Potomac, Maryland
Sportspeople from Arlington County, Virginia
Players of American football from San Diego
Players of American football from Maryland
Players of American football from Virginia
American people of Palestinian descent
American football quarterbacks
Canadian football quarterbacks
Indiana Hoosiers football players
Washington Redskins players
Los Angeles Avengers players
Amsterdam Admirals players
Seattle Seahawks players
San Francisco 49ers players
Miami Dolphins players
Buffalo Bills players
Toronto Argonauts players
American sportspeople of Pakistani descent
Expatriate players of American football
American expatriate sportspeople in the Netherlands
Indiana Hoosiers baseball players